Thousand Trails is a membership campground company operating private trailer park and  campground resorts (referred to as "preserves" in company parlance) in the United States and Canada. As of 2010, the company claimed to have 130,000 "member families" and over 80 preserves in 23 states and the Canadian province of British Columbia. Members typically pay a one-time membership fee and annual dues to use Thousand Trails campgrounds, which tend to cater to the owners of recreational vehicles. Over the years, Thousand Trails has offered different types of memberships. Some memberships allow members to have longer continuous stays at a campground and grant access to a greater number of campgrounds.

History

The company was founded by Milt Kuolt in 1969 with one campground in Chehalis, Washington. In 1979, Kuolt made Thousand Trails a publicly traded corporation. Kuolt would go on to found the airline Horizon Air, which he sold in 1986 to Alaska Airlines.

In 1991, Thousand Trails and another membership campground company, NACO (National American Corporation), both came under the umbrella of the newly formed USTrails, Inc. (which took the name Thousand Trails, Inc., in 1996). Concurrent with this consolidation, USTrails filed for Chapter 11 bankruptcy in May 1991.

In 1999, Thousand Trails, Inc. purchased the holding company that owned Leisure Time Resorts of America, Inc., a network of ten membership campgrounds in Washington and Oregon.  Since that time, ownership has changed repeatedly: the private equity firm of Kohlberg & Co. purchased Thousand Trails for $113 million in 2003, Privileged Access Gp. Corp. of Frisco, Texas, bought it in 2006, and Equity Lifestyle Properties bought it in 2008.

References

External links

Camping in the United States
1969 establishments in Washington (state)